Housing Development Finance Corporation Limited (HDFC) is an Indian private development finance institution based in Mumbai. It is a major housing finance provider in India. It also has a presence in banking, life and general insurance, asset management, venture capital, realty, education, deposits and education loans.

History
It was founded in 1977 with the support from India's business community, as the first specialised mortgage company in India and main company among HDFC group of companies. HDFC was promoted by the Industrial Credit and Investment Corporation of India (ICICI). Hasmukhbhai Parekh played a key role in the foundation of this company which started with the main aim of solving the housing shortage in India and started rising steadily thereafter.

In 2000, HDFC Asset Management Company launched its mutual fund schemes. In the same year, IRDA granted registration to HDFC Standard Life Insurance, as the first private sector life insurance company in India. Currently it operates in India, Kuwait, Oman, Qatar, Saudi Arabia, Singapore, United Arab Emirates and United Kingdom.

Products and services

Mortgage

The company provides housing finance to individuals and corporates for purchase/construction of residential houses. The type of loans offered by company include loans for purchase and construction of a residential units, purchase of land, home improvement loans, home extension loans, non-residential premise loans for professionals and loan against property and repayment options include step-up repayment facility and flexible loan instalment plan. It is one of the largest providers of housing loans in India. In its Annual Report for financial year 2012–13, the company has disclosed that it has disbursed approx. INR 456,000 crores in 35 years of its existence for a total of 4.4 million housing units.The average loan profile amounts to INR 2.18 million (US$35,160) which lasts for about 13 years and covers approx. 65% of actual property value. From the year 2000,the company started offering housing loans on the Internet becoming first company to do so.

Life insurance
The company has been providing life insurance since the year 2000, through its subsidiary HDFC Standard Life Insurance company Limited. It offers 33 individual products and 8 group products. It uses the HDFC group network to cross sell by offering customized products. It operates out of 451 offices across India serving over 965 locations. It had a market share of 4.6% of life insurance business in India as of 30 September 2013. HDFC Life has over 15,000 employees.

General insurance
The company offers general insurance products such as:
 Motor, health, travel, home and personal accident in the retail segment which accounts for 47% of its total business and
 Property, marine, aviation and liability insurance in the corporate segment

Mutual funds
HDFC provides mutual fund services through its subsidiary HDFC Asset Management accountingy Limited. The average assets under management (AUM) of HDFC Mutual Fund for the quarter Jul-13 to Sep-13 was INR 1.03 trillion.

Operations
HDFC's distribution network spans 396 outlets (including 109 offices of HDFC's distribution company HDFC Sales Private Limited) which cater to approx. 2,400 towns and cities spread across India. To cater to Non-Resident Indians, HDFC has  offices in London, Singapore  and Dubai and service associates in Middle East countries. The first overseas office was opened in Dubai in 1996 and in 2000's was expanded to London and Singapore.
In addition, HDFC covers over 90 locations through its outreach programmes. HDFC's marketing efforts continue to be concentrated on developing a stronger distribution network. Home loans are also sourced through HDFC Sales, HDFC Bank Limited and other third party Direct selling Agents (DSA). The corporation has 232 institutional owners and shareholders filing through 13D/G or 13F forms with the Securities Exchange Commission. Largest investor amongst them is Vanguard International Growth Fund.

Major subsidiaries and associates
HDFC's key associate and subsidiary companies include HDFC Bank Limited, HDFC Standard Life Insurance Company Limited, HDFC ERGO General Insurance Company Limited, HDFC Asset Management Company Limited, GRUH Finance, HDFC Venture Capital Limited, HDFC RED, HDFC Sales Private limited and Credila Financial Services Private Limited.

HDFC Bank
HDFC holds 26.14% of shares in HDFC Bank.  HDFC Bank sources home loans for HDFC for a fee.
The key business areas of HDFC bank are wholesale and retail banking and treasury operations. On 31 March 2013, its market capitalisation was INR 1.5 trillion (US$27.31 billion), making it India's seventh largest publicly traded company.

HDFC Standard Life Insurance Company Limited
HDFC holds approx. 51.7% of shares in HDFC Life. Standard Life holds 49% shares as per latest Financial Statements. In September 2013, it was ranked third in terms of market share of private life insurance companies in India. On the same date, it had a network of approx. 72,000 financial consultants to sell its policies.

HDFC Asset Management Company
HDFC formed HDFC Mutual Fund as a joint venture with Standard Life Investments in 1999. HDFC Asset Management Company is the investment manager of HDFC Mutual Fund's schemes. HDFC holds a 52.6% stake while Abrdn holds another 10.21%, as of December 2022. HDFC AMC manages 68 schemes comprising debt, equity, exchange traded fund and fund of fund schemes. Average assets under management (AUM) as at the end of March 2022 is 4.07553 trillion. It is ranked first in the industry in India on the basis of average assets under management.

HDFC ERGO General Insurance Company
HDFC formed this General Insurance company with ERGO Insurance Group. HDFC holds 50.5% and ERGO holds 26% of the shares. By the end of September 2013, its Market share in General Insurance stood at 4.1% (overall) in terms of gross gross direct premium in first half year of FY 2013–14. The total employee strength of the company as of March 31, 2013 was 1,389.

HDFC Property Fund
It was launched in 2005. Its first scheme was a close ended fund for domestic investors: 'HDFC India Real Estate Fund'. The funds of this scheme are managed by HDFC Venture Capital Limited. Its another scheme is for international investors and is a closed ended fund: 'HIREF International Fund'.

HDFC RED
Launched in 2010, HDFC has 100% shares for HDFC RED, a real estate online listings platform operating under HDFC Developers Ltd. The company focuses on real estate, avoiding resale and rental services.

HDFC Credila Financial Services
HDFC Credila is a non-banking finance company and was the first Indian lender to exclusively focus on education loans. The company lends to under-graduate and post-graduate students studying in India or abroad. HDFC holds approx. 90% shares in this company. The average amount of education loan disbursed is INR 880,000 approx.

GRUH Finance
HDFC held approx. 59% in GRUH, a housing finance company offering loans to individuals for purchase, construction and renovation of dwelling units. GRUH also offers loans to the self-employed segment where formal income proofs are not available. It has a retail network of 136 offices across 7 states in India.

On 17 October 2019, GRUH Finance was formally merged into Bandhan Bank, giving HDFC a 14.9% stake in Bandhan.

Listings and shareholding
Listing: The equity shares of HDFC are listed on Bombay Stock Exchange where it is a constituent of the BSE SENSEX index, and the National Stock Exchange of India where it is a constituent of the S&P CNX Nifty.

Shareholding: On 30 September 2013, 73.09% of the equity shares of the company were owned by the Foreign Institutional Investors (FII). Around 185,000 individual public shareholders own approx. 9.25% of its shares. The remaining 17.66% shares are owned by others.

Employees
As of 31 March 2013, the company had 1,833 employees, out of which 22% were women. The company incurred INR 5.28 billion on employee benefit expenses for the financial year 2012–13.
For FY 2012–13, the company reported a per employee profit of US$484,000 and per employee assets of US$18.5 million.
HDFC's Training Centre is located in Lonavla Mumbai and it was established in 1989. It is mainly used for training programmes, workshops, conferences and strategy meetings.

Awards and recognition
 In 2013, a survey on "India's Best Boards" listed HDFC's Board of Directors among the 5 best boards in India.
 In May 2013, Forbes listed it at #561 in the Global 2000 list of largest companies.
 In 2012, HDFC Limited was recognised as one of India's 'Best Companies to work for' in a joint study conducted by The Economic Times and 'The Great Place to Work Institute'.

See also
 Mortgage loan
 HDFC Life
 HDFC Bank
 HDFC securities

References

External links
 

 

BSE SENSEX
Housing finance companies of India
Financial services companies based in Mumbai
NIFTY 50
HDFC Group
Financial services companies established in 1977
Indian companies established in 1977
1977 establishments in Maharashtra
Companies listed on the National Stock Exchange of India
Companies listed on the Bombay Stock Exchange